The femoral nerve is a nerve in the thigh that supplies skin on the upper thigh and inner leg, and the muscles that extend the knee.

Structure
The femoral nerve is the major nerve supplying the anterior compartment of the thigh. It is the largest branch of the lumbar plexus, and arises from the dorsal divisions of the ventral rami of the second, third, and fourth lumbar nerves (L2, L3, and L4).

The nerve enters Scarpa's triangle by passing beneath the inguinal ligament, just lateral to the femoral artery. In the thigh, the nerve lies in a groove between iliacus muscle and psoas major muscle, outside the femoral sheath, and lateral to the femoral artery. After a short course of about 4 cm in the thigh, the nerve is divided into anterior and posterior divisions, separated by lateral femoral circumflex artery. The branches are shown below:

Muscular branches
 The nerve to the pectineus muscle arises immediately above the inguinal ligament from the medial side of the femoral nerve, and passes behind the femoral sheath to enter the anterior surface of the muscle.
 Anterior division supplies the sartorius muscle
 Posterior division supplies the rectus femoris muscle, the three vasti (vastus medialis muscle, vastus lateralis muscle, and vastus intermedius muscle), and articularis genus muscle. The articularis genus is supplied by a branch of the nerve to vastus intermedius.

Cutaneous branches
 The anterior division gives off anterior cutaneous branches: The anterior cutaneous branches are: the intermediate femoral cutaneous nerve and the medial femoral cutaneous nerve.
 The posterior division gives off only one branch, which is the saphenous nerve.

Articular branches
 Hip joint is supplied by nerve to the rectus femoris.
 Knee joint is supplied by the nerves to the three vasti. The nerve to vastus medialis is particularly thick because it contains the proprioceptive fibres from the knee joint. This is in accordance to the Hilton's law.

Vascular branches
 Branches to the femoral artery and its branches.

Clinical significance
Signals from the femoral nerve and its branches can be blocked to interrupt transmission of pain signal from the innervation area, by performing a regional nerve blockage. Some of the nerve blocks that work by affecting the femoral nerve are the femoral nerve block, the fascia iliac block and the 3-in-1 nerve block. Femoral nerve blocks are very effective.

During pelvic surgery and abdominal surgery, the femoral nerve must be identified early on to protect it from iatrogenic nerve injury.

The femoral nerve stretch test can be performed to identify the compression of spinal nerve roots. The test is positive if thigh pain increases.

Additional images

See also
 Femoral nerve stretch test

References

External links
 
  - "Femoral nerve dysfunction" (includes illustration)
  - "Posterior Abdominal Wall: Nerves of the Lumbar Plexus"
 
 
  arteries-nerves%20LE/nerves1 at the Dartmouth Medical School's Department of Anatomy

Nerves of the lower limb and lower torso